Millburn is a New Jersey Transit station in Millburn, New Jersey along the Morristown and Gladstone lines.

History 

The Millburn station predates the town's formal incorporation and in fact dates back to 1837. It was one of the original stations served by the original Morris and Essex Railroad.

In 1837, the first steam locomotive to run along the M&E line made its trial run to Millburn (called "Millville" in that year). Unhappily, that particular excursion ended in tragedy as the train, in push mode for the return trip, derailed near Newark Broad Street Station, with two fatalities.

However, rail service eastward to Newark, and westward to Dover, proved a boon to the town—so much so that local historians credit the railroad as the chief impetus for Millburn's incorporation as a separate municipality in 1857.

Station layout and facility 
The Millburn station, built in 1906-07, is located at the intersection of Essex Street and Lackawanna Place near the southern entrance of South Mountain Reservation.

The station consists of two ground-level platforms and a single building on the eastbound (toward Hoboken and New York Penn Station) side. This building houses a waiting area and a ticket office, which is normally open on weekday mornings only.  There are also ticket vending machines installed.

These platforms are low-level side platforms. Passengers boarding or debarking at this station must use the stairs on each car. Millburn station is not considered handicap-accessible.

The eastbound and westbound (toward Gladstone and Hackettstown) platforms are accessible from two concrete stairwells that rise from Lackawanna Place, next to the metal trestle that carries the tracks over Lackawanna Place. Passengers can also cross from one platform to another through a tunnel near the ticket office.

Parking is available in a large parking lot on the westbound side and in a lot adjacent to the parking lot of the Millburn Free Public Library on the far side of Lackawanna Place.

Nearby businesses, facilities, and attractions 

The Millburn Professional Building stands on the westbound platform, directly opposite the station building. This was probably one of the original station buildings but does not today house any New Jersey Transit offices. Another major office building stands directly west of the station building, nearer the Lackawanna Place trestle.

The Millburn Free Public Library is located across Lackawanna Place, and the Millburn-Short Hills Volunteer First Aid Squad is located on Glen Avenue on the north side of the station parking lot.

The station is also located near a thriving shopping and financial district. The Paper Mill Playhouse is within walking distance (0.4 miles). Several restaurants, offering a wide variety of cuisines, are located across Essex Street from the station.

Bibliography

References

External links

 entrance from parking lot from Google Maps Street View

Millburn, New Jersey
NJ Transit Rail Operations stations
Railway stations in the United States opened in 1837
Railway stations in Essex County, New Jersey
Former Delaware, Lackawanna and Western Railroad stations
1837 establishments in New Jersey